This is a list of the butterflies of Laos.

Families

 Papilionidae—swallowtail butterflies
 Pieridae—yellow-white butterflies
 Nymphalidae—brush-footed butterflies
 Lycaenidae—blues, hairstreaks and gossamer-winged butterflies
 Riodinidae—metalmark butterflies
 Hesperiidae—skipper butterflies

Family Papilionidae

Subfamily Parnassiinae

 Bhutan glory (Bhutanitis lidderdalii)

Subfamily Papilioninae

Brown gorgon (Meandrusa sciron)
Yellow gorgon (Meandrusa payeni)
Kaiser-i-Hind (Teinopalpus imperialis)
Glassy bluebottle (Graphium cloanthus)
Common bluebottle (Graphium sarpedon)
Common jay (Graphium doson)
Lesser jay (Graphium evemon)
Great jay (Graphium eurypylus)
Veined jay (Graphium eurypylus)
Veined jay (Graphium chironides)
Tailed jay (Graphium agamemnon)
Spotted jay (Graphium arycles)
Fourbar swordtail (Graphium agetes)
Spot swordtail (Graphium nomius)
Five-bar swordtail (Graphium antiphates)
Laos swordtail (Graphium phidias)
Lesser zebra (Graphium macareus)
Great zebra (Graphium xenocles)
Spotted zebra (Graphium megarus)
Yellow spotted swordtail (Graphium mullah)
White dragontail (Lamproptera curius)
Green dragontail (Lamproptera meges)
Tawny mime (Papilio agestor)
Lesser mime (Papilio epycides)
Blue striped mime (Papilio slateri)
Common mime (Papilio clytia)
Great blue mime (Papilio paradoxa)
Lime butterfly (Papilio demoleus)
Common yellow swallowtail (Papilio machaon)
Banded swallowtail (Papilio demolion)
Noble swallowtail (Papilio noblei)
Common raven (Papilio castor)
Yellow Hellen (Papilio nephelus)
Red Hellen (Papilio helenus)
Common Mormon (Papilio polytes)
Great Mormon (Papilio memnon)
Tailed redbreast (Papilio bootes)
Spangle (Papilio protenor)
Paris peacock (Papilio paris)
Common peacock (Papilio polyctor)
Common batwing (Atrophaneura varuna)
Lesser batwing (Atrophaneura aidoneus)
Black windmill (Atrophaneura crassipes)
Common clubtail (Losaria coon)
Lao windmill (Byasa laos)
Adamson's rose (Byasa adamsoni)
Common windmill (Byasa polyeuctes)
Common birdwing (Troides helena)
Golden birdwing (Troides aeacus)
Common rose (Pachliopta aristolochiae)

Family Pieridae

Subfamily: Coliadinae

 Orange emigrant (Catopsilia scylla)
 Mottled emigrant (Catopsilia pyranthe)
 Common emigrant (Catopsilia pomona)
 Tailed sulphur (Dercas verhuelli)
 Tree yellow (Gandaca harina)
 Common grass yellow (Eurema hecabe)
 Three-spot grass yellow (Eurema blanda)
 Scarce changeable grass yellow (Eurema simulatrix sarinoides) (Fruhstorfer, 1910)
 Chocolate grass yellow (Eurema sari) (Moore, 1886)
 Anderson's grass yellow (Eurema andersoni sadanobui) (Shirôzu & Yata, 1982)

Subfamily: Pierinae

Psyche (Leptosia nina) (Fabricius, 1793)
Vietnam Jezebel (Delias vietnamensis) (Monastyrskii & Devyatkin, 2000)
White-streaked Jezebel (Delias lativitta tai) (Yoshino, 1999)
Pale Jezebel (Delias sanaca) (Moore, 1857)
Redspot Jezebel (Delias descombesi) (Boisduval, 1836)
Painted Jezebel (Delias hyparete) (Linnaeus, 1758)
Common gull (Cepora nerissa) (Fabricius, 1775)
Lesser gull (Cepora nadina) (Lucas, 1852)
Spotted sawtooth (Prioneris thestylis) (Doubleday, 1842)
Eastern striped albatross (Appias olferna) (Swinhoe, 1890)
Chocolate albatross (Appias lyncida) (Cramer, 1779)
Orange albatross (Appias nero) (Butler, 1867)
Indian orange albatross (Appias galba) (Wallace, 1867)
Common albatross (Appias albina) (Boisduval, 1836)
Plain puffin (Appias indra) (Moore, 1858)
Large cabbage white (Pieris brassicae) (Gray, 1846)
Small cabbage white (Pieris rapae) (Boisduval, 1836)
Green veined white (Artogeia erutae) (Verity, 1911)
Yellow orange tip (Ixias pyrene) (Linnaeus, 1764)
Great orange tip (Hebomoia glaucippe) (Linnaeus, 1758)
Pale wanderer (Pareronia avatar) (Moore, 1858)
Common wanderer (Pareronia valeria) (Butler, 1879)

Family Lycaenidae

Subfamily: Poritiinae

 Common gem (Poritia hewitsoni ampsaga) (Fruhstorfer, 1912)

Subfamily: Curetinae

 Bright sunbeam (Curetis bulis) (Westwood, 1851)
 Tonkin sunbeam (Curetis tonkina) (Evans, 1954)

Subfamily: Lycaeninae

 Purple sapphire (Heliophorus epicles latilimbata) (Fruhstorfer, 1908)

Subfamily: Miletinae 

 Siam brownie (Miletus archilochus siamensis) (Godfrey, 1916)
 Mallus brownie (Miletus mallus mallus) (Fruhstorfer, 1913)
 Corbet's darkie (Allotinus corbeti) (Eliot, 1956)
 Crenulate darkie (Allotinus drumila) (Moore, 1865)
 Blue darkie (Allotinus subviolaceus subviolaceus) Felder & Felder, [1865]
 Moore's darkie (Allotinus substrigosus substrigosus) (Moore, 1884)
 Lesser darkie (Allotinus unicolor rekkia) Riley & Godfrey, 1921
 Dark mottle (Logania distanti massalia) Doherty, 1891
 Pale mottle (Logania marmorata marmorata) Moore, 1884
 Watson's mottle (Logania watsoniana) de Niceville, 1898
 Apefly (Spalgis epeus epeus) (Moore, 1878)

Subfamily: Polyommatinae 

Common Pierrot (Castalius rosimon rosimon) (Fabricius, 1775)
Spotted Pierrot (Tarucus callinara) Butler, 1886
Pea blue (Lampides boeticus) (Linnaeus, 1767)
Straight Pierrot (Caleta roxus roxana) (de Niceville, 1897)
Elbowed Pierrot (Caleta elna noliteia) (Fruhstorfer, 1918)
Angled Pierrot (Caleta decidia decidia) (Hewitson, [1876])
Banded blue Pierrot (Discolampa ethion ethion) (Westwood, [1851])
Short-tailed blue (Everes argiades diporides) Chapman, 1909
Indian Cupid (Everes lacturnus lacturnus) (Godart, [1824])
Dusky blue Cupid (Everes huegelii dipora) Moore, 1865)
Prized hedge blue (Udara dilecta dilecta) (Moore, 1879)
Howarth's hedge blue (Udara placidula howarthi) (Cantlie & Norman, 1960)
White hedge blue (Udara akasa sadanobui) Eliot & Kawazoe, 1983
Bicolored hedge blue (Udara selma cerima) (Corbet, 1937)
Albocerulean (Udara albocaerulea albocaerulea) (Moore, 1879)
Common hedge blue (Acytolepis puspa gisca) (Fruhstorfer, 1910)
Hampson's hedge blue (Acytolepis lilacea indochinensis) Eliot & Kawazoe, 1983
Margined hedge blue (Celatoxia marginata marginata) (de Niceville, [1884])
Plain hedge blue (Celastrina lavendularis limbata) (Moore, 1879)
Metallic hedge blue (Callenya melaena melaena) (Doherty, 1899)
Swinhoe's hedge blue (Monodontides musina pelides) (Fruhstorfer, 1910)
Lesser grass blue (Zizina otis sangra) (Moore, [1866])
Pale grass blue (Zizeeria maha maha) (Kollar, [1844])
Dark grass blue (Zizeeria karsandra) (Moore, 1865)
Tiny grass blue (Zizula hylax hylax) (Fabricius, 1775)
Black spotted grass blue (Famegana alsulus eggletoni) (Corbet, 1941)
Oriental grass jewel (Chilades putli) (Kollar, [1844])
Lime blue (Chilades lajus lajus) (Stoll, [1780])
Plains Cupid (Luthrodes pandava pandava) (Horsfield, [1829])
Gram blue (Euchrysops cnejus) (Fabricius, 1798)
Forget-me-not (Catochrysops strabo strabo) (Fabricius, 1793)
Zebra blue (Leptotes plinius) (Fabricius, 1793)
Dark cerulean (Jamides bochus bochus) (Stoll, [1782])
Common cerulean (Jamides celeno celeno (Cramer, [1775])
White cerulean (Jamides pura pura) (Moore, 1886)
Glistering cerulean (Jamides elpis pseudelpis) (Butler, [1879])
Royal cerulean (Jamides caeruleus caeruleus) (H. Druce, 1873)
Metallic cerulean (Jamides alecto alocina) Swinhoe, 1915
White line blue (Nacaduba angusta albida) Riley & Godfrey, 1925
Rounded six-line blue (Nacaduba berenice aphya) Fruhstorfer, 1916
Opaque six-line blue (Nacaduba beroe gythion) Fruhstorfer, 1916
Transparent six-line blue (Nacaduba kurava euplea) Fruhstorfer, 1916
Large four-line blue (Nacaduba pactolus continentalis) Fruhstorfer, 1916
Violet four-line blue (Nacaduba subperusia lysa) Fruhstorfer, 1916
Jewel four-line blue (Nacaduba sanaya naevia) Toxopeus, 1929
Pointed lineblue (Ionolyce helicon merguiana) (Moore, 1884)
Banded lineblue (Prosotas aluta coelestis) (Wood-Mason & de Niceville, [1887])
Bhutya lineblue (Prosotas bhutea bhutea) (de Niceville, [1884])
Tailess lineblue (Prosotas dubiosa indica) (Evans, 1925)
Dark-based lineblue (Prosotas gracilis ni) (de Niceville, 1902)
Brown lineblue (Prosotas lutea sivoka) (Evans, 1910)
Common lineblue (Prosotas nora ardates) (Moore, [1875])
White-tipped lineblue (Prosotas noreia hampsoni) (de Niceville, 1885)
Margined lineblue (Prosotas pia marginata) Tite, 1963
Dingy lineblue (Petrelaea dana) (de Niceville, [1884])
Una (Una usta usta) (Distant, 1886)
Chinese straight-wing blue (Orthomiella rantaizana rovorea) (Fruhstorfer, 1918)
Staight-wing blue (Orthomiella pontis fukienensis) Forster, 1941
White-banded Pierrot (Niphanda asialis) (de Niceville, 1895)
Pointed Pierrot (Niphanda cymbia cymbia) de Niceville, [1884]
Large pointed Pierrot (Niphanda tessellata tessellata) Moore, [1875]
Ciliate blue (Anthene emolus emolus) (Godart, [1824])
White ciliate blue (Anthene licates dusuntua) Corbet, 1940
Poined ciliate blue (Anthene lycaenina lycambes) (Hewitson, [1878])

Subfamily: Theclinae 

Evan's silverline (Cigaritis evansii ayuthia) (Murayama & Kimura, 1990)
Pale-banded silverline (Cigaritis learmondi) (Tytler, 1940)
Aroon's silverline (Cigaritis leechi arooni) (Murayama & Kimura, 1990)
Long-banded silverline (Cigaritis lohita himalayanus) (Moore, 1884)
Karen silverline (Cigaritis maximus) (Elwes, [1893])
Laos silverline (Cigaritis miyamotoi) Saito & Seki, 2008
Silver-red silverline (Cigaritis rukma) (de Niceville, [1889])
Fruhstorfer's silverline (Cigaritis seliga) (Fruhstorfer, [1912])
Club silverline (Cigaritis syama peguanus) (Moore, 1884)
Aberrant silverline (Cigaritis vixinga davidsoni) (Talbot, 1936)
Common silverline (Cigaritis vulcanus tavoyana) (Evans, 1925)
Brown yamfly (Drina donina donina) (Hewitson, [1865])
White imperial (Neomyrina nivea hiemalis) (Godman & Salvin, 1878)
Yamfly (Loxura atymnus continentalis) Fruhstorfer, [1912]
Branded yamfly (Yasoda tripunctata tripunctata) (Hewitson, [1863])
Fruhstorfer's yamfly (Yasoda androconifera) Fruhstorfer, [1912]
Cardinal (Thamala marciana marciana) (Hewitson, [1863])
Common imperial (Cheritra freja evansi) Cowan, 1965
Truncate imperial (Cheritrella truncipennis) de Niceville, 1887
Blue imperial (Ticherra acte acte) (Moore, [1858])
Siamese onyx (Ahmetia achaja achaja) (Fruhstorfer, [1912])
Common posy (Drupadia ravindra boisduvalii) Moore, 1884
Dark posy (Drupadia theda fabricii) Moore, 1884
Blue posy (Drupadia scaeva cooperi) (Tytler, 1940)
Silverstreak blue (Iraota timoleon timoleon) (Stoll, [1790])
Scarce silverstreak (Iraota rochana boswelliana) Distant, 1885
Blue leafblue (Amblypodia narada taooana) Moore, [1879]
Purple leafblue (Amblypodia anita anita) Hewitson, 1862
Pale bushblue (Arhopala aberrans) (de Niceville, [1889])
Aberrant bushblue (Arhopala abseus indicus) Riley, 1923
Tytler's dull oakblue (Arhopala ace arata) Tytler, 1915
Large oakblue (Arhopala amantes amatrix) de Niceville, 1891
Centaur oakblue (Arhopala centaurus nakula) (Felder & Felder, 1860)
Large metallic oakblue (Arhopala aedias meritatas) Corbet, 1941
Purple-glazed oakblue (Arhopala agaba) (Hewitson, 1862)
De Niceville's oakblue (Arhopala agrata binghami) Corbet 1946
White-stained oakblue (Arhopala aida aida) de Niceville, 1889
Purple broken-band oakblue (Arhopala alitaeus mirabella) Doherty, 1889
Magnificent oakblue (Arhopala anarte anarte) (Hewitson, 1862)
Anthelus bushblue (Arhopala anthelus) (Westwood, [1852])
Small tailless oakblue (Arhopala antimuta antimuta) Felder & Felder, [1865]
Purple-brown tailless oakblue (Arhopala arvina aboe) de Niceville, 1895(Hewitson, [1863])
Plain tailless oakblue (Arhopala asopia) (Hewitson, [1869])
Broad-banded oakblue (Arhopala asinarus asinarus) Felder & Felder, [1865]
Tailed disc oakblue (Arhopala atosia jahara) Corbet, 1941 
Dark broken-band oakblue (Arhopala atrax) (Hewitson, 1862)
Grey-washed oakblue (Arhopala aurelia) (Evans, 1925)
Powered oakblue (Arhopala bazalus teesta) (de Niceville, 1886)
Burmese bushblue (Arhopala birmana birmana) (Moore, [1884])
White-dot oakblue (Arhopala democritus democritus) (Fabricius, 1793)
Frosted oakblue (Arhopala dispar dispar) Riley & Godfrey, 1921
Violetdisc oakblue (Arhopala epimete duessa) Doherty, 1889
Green oakblue (Arhopala eumolphus eumolphus) (Cramer, [1780])
Spotless oakblue (Arhopala fulla ignara) Riley & Godfrey, 1921
Tailess bushblue (Arhopala ganesa watsoni) Evans, 1912
Doherty's green oakblue (Arhopala hellenore hellenore) Doherty, 1889
Doherty's dull oakblue (Arhopala khamti) Doherty, 1891
Pale yellow oakblue (Arhopala moolaiana maya) (Evans, 1932)
Mutal oakblue (Arhopala muta merguiana) Corbet, 1941
Hewitson's dull oakblue (Arhopala oenea oenea) (Hewitson, [1869])
Opal oakblue (Arhopala opalina opalina) (Moore, [1884])
Dusky bushblue (Arhopala paraganesa zephyretta) (Doherty, 1891)
Hooked oakblue (Arhopala paramuta paramuta) (de Niceville, [1884])
Yellowdisc oakblue (Arhopala perimuta perimuta) (Moore, [1858])
Dark Himalayan oakblue (Arhopala rama ramosa) (Evans, 1925)
Reddish-brown oakblue (Arhopala selta selta) (Hewitson, [1869])
Sylhet oakblue (Arhopala silhetensis silhetensis) (Hewitson, 1862)
Pointed oakblue (Arhopala singla) (de Niceville, 1885)
Large spotted oakblue (Arhopala vihara hirava) Corbet, 1941
Zambra oakblue (Arhopala zambra zambra) Swinhoe, [1911]
Silky oakblue (Arhopala alax) (Evans, 1932)
Darkie plushblue (Flos anniella artegal) Doherty, 1889
Plain plushblue (Flos apidanus ahamus) Doherty, 1891
Tailess plushblue (Flos areste) (Hewitson, 1862)
Spangled plushblue (Flos asoka) (de Niceville, [1884])
Bifid plushblue (Flos diardi diardi) (Hewitson, 1862)
Shining plushblue (Flos fulgida fulgida) (Hewitson, [1863])
Variegated plushblue (Flos adriana) (de Niceville, [1884])
Many-tailed oakblue (Thaduka multicaudata multicaudata) Moore, [1879]
Falcate oakblue (Mahathala ameria ameria) (Hewitson, 1862)
Crenulate oakblue (Apporasa atkinsoni) (Hewitson, [1869])
Red-edge (Semanga superba siamensis) Talbot, 1936
Common acacia blue (Surendra quercetorum quercetorum) (Moore, [1858])
Acacia blue (Surendra vivarna neritos) (Fruhstorfer, 1907)
Silver streaked acacia blue (Zinaspa todara) (Moore, [1884])
Commomn tinsel (Catapaecilma major albicans) Corbet, 1941
Cornelian (Deudorix epijarbas epijarbas) (Moore, [1858])
Scarce cornelian (Deudorix hypargyria hypargyria) (Elwes, [1893])
Abnormal flash (Rapala duma) Hewitson, 1878
Frustorfer's flash (Rapala melida nicevillei) Swinhoe, 1911
Common flash (Rapala nissa ranta) Swinhoe, 1897
Indigo flash (Rapala varuna orseis) Hewitson, [1863]
Copper flash (Rapala pheretima petosiris) (Hewitson, [1863])
Myanmar flash (Rapala hades) (de Niceville, 1895)
Malayan red flash (Rapala damona) Swinhoe, 1890
Common red flash (Rapala iarbus iarbus)  (Fabricius, 1787)
Slate flash (Rapala manea schistacea) (Moore, 1879)
Scarce shot flash (Rapala scintilla scintilla) de Niceville, 1890
Branded flash (Rapala tara) de Niceville, [1889]
Brown flash (Rapala rectivitta) (Moore, 1879)
Suffused flash (Rapala suffusa suffusa) (Moore, [1879])
Broad spark (Sinthusa chandrana grotei) (Moore, [1884])
Narrow spark (Sinthusa nasaka obscurata) Fruhstorfer, [1912]
Lister's hairstreak (Pamela dudgeonii) (de Niceville, 1894)
Green hairstreak (Novosatsuma oppocoenosa) Johnson, 1992
Ahlbergia pluto (Leech, 1893)
Common onyx (Horaga onyx onyx) (Moore, [1858])
Violet onyx (Horaga albimacula viola) Moore, 1882
Purple onyx (Horaga amethysta purpurescens) Corbet, 1941
White onyx (Horaga takanamii) Seki & Saito, [2004]
Orchid tit (Hypolycaena othona) Hewitson, 1865
Blue tit (Hypolycaena kina inari) (Wileman, 1908)
Common tit (Hypolycaena erylus himavantus) Fruhstorfer, [1912]
Fluffy tit (Hypolycaena amasa amasa) Hewitson, [1865]
Azure royal (Britomartis cleoboides cleoboides) (Elwes, [1893])
Mandarin blue (Charana mandarina mandarina)  (Hewitson, [1863])
Broadtail royal (Creon cleobis cleobis) (Godart, [1824])
White-banded royal (Dacalana cotys) (Hewitson, [1865])
Spectacular royal (Dacalana inorthodoxa) Seki & Saito, 2006
Diagonal royal (Dacalana penicilligera) (de Niceville, 1890)

Family: Riodinidae 

 Abnormal Judy (Abisara abnormis) Moore, [1884]
 Double-banded Judy (Abisara bifasciata angulata) Moore, [1879]
 White-spotted Judy (Abisara burnii timaeus) (Fruhstorfer, [1904])
 Plum Judy (Abisara echerius paionea) Fruhstorfer, [1914]
 Lesser Judy (Abisara freda freda) Bennett, 1957
 Dark Judy (Abisara fylla fylla) (Westwood, [1851])
 Two-spotted Judy (Abisara miyazakii shigehoi) K. & T. Saito, 2005
 Tailed Judy (Abisara neophron gratius) Fruhstorfer, 1912
 Forest Judy (Abisara saturata meta) Fruhstorfer, [1904]
 White-banded Judy (Abisara latifasciata) Inoué & Kawazoé, 1964
 Striped Punch (Dodona adonira adonira) Hewitson, [1866]
 White Punch (Dodona deodata deodata) Hewitson, 1876
 Lesser Punch (Dodona dipoea) Hewitson, [1866]
 Orange Punch (Dodona egeon egeon) (Westwood, [1851])
 Tailed Punch (Dodona eugenes venox) Fruhstorfer, 1912
 Katerina's Punch (Dodona katerina katerina) Monastyrskii & Devyatkin, 2000
Spotted Punch (Dodona maculosa maculosa) Leech, 1890
Mixed Punch (Dodona ouida ouida) Hewitson, [1866]
Spectacular Punch (Dodona speciosa) Monastyrskii & Devyatkin, 2000
Dark Punch (Dodona dracon dracon) de Nicéville, 1897
Lesser harlequin (Laxita thuisto ephorus) (Fruhstorfer, [1904])
Common red harlequin (Paralaxita telesia boulleti) (Fruhstorfer, [1914])
Columbine (Stiboges nymphidia nymphidia) Butler, 1876
Orange harlequin (Taxila haquinus berthae) Fruhstorfer, [1904]
Dora's harlequin (Taxila dora) Fruhstorfer, [1904]
Punchinello (Zemeros flegyas allica) (Fabricius, 1787)
Mountain columbine (Stiboges elodinia) Fruhstorfer, [1914]

References
 Bernard D'Abrera Butterflies of the Oriental Region. Part 1 (1981) Papilionidae, Pieridae, Danaidae Part 2 (1983) Nymphalidae, Satyridae, Amathusidae  Part 3 (1986) Lycaenidae, Riodinidae  Hill House Publishers Lansdowne Editions.
 Charles Thomas Bingham in William Thomas Blanford Ed. The Fauna of British India, Including Ceylon and Burma London,Taylor & Francis Volume 1 1905, Volume 2 1907 online
 Cotton, A.M. & T. Racheli, 2007 Preliminary Annotated Checklist of the Papilionidae of Laos with Notes on Taxonomy, Phenology, Distribution and Variation (Lepidoptera, Papilionoidea). Fragmenta Entomologica, Roma, 38(2): 279-378.
 Davidson, D.M. & J.J.Macbeth, 1938 The Butterflies of Siam. The Journal of the Siam Society: Natural History Suppl. 11(2):67-95.
 Fleming, W. A., 1975 Butterflies of West Malaysia & Singapore Berkshire, Eng.: Classey Publications Two volumes  (volume 1)
 Fruhstorfer, H., 1910 The Indo-Australian Rhopalocera. [Danaidae] in Seitz, A. (ed.). The Macrolepidoptera of the World: A Systematic Description of the Hitherto Known Macrolepidoptera. Stuttgart: Alfred Kernen Vol. 9 1197 pp.
 Fruhstorfer, H., 1911. Appendix to Danaidae in Seitz, A. (ed.). The Macrolepidoptera of the World. 9. The Indo-Australian Rhopalocera. 2 vols. Stuttgart: Alfred Kernen Verlag viii+1197 pp.
 Fruhstorfer, H., 1911. The Indo-Australian Rhopalocera. [Amathusiidae]. pp. 403–448 in Seitz, A. (ed.). The Macrolepidoptera of the World: A Systematic Description of the Hitherto Known Macrolepidoptera. Stuttgart: Alfred Kernen Vol. 9 1197 pp.
 Fruhstorfer, H., 1911. The Indo-Australian Rhopalocera. [Satyridae]. 285-401 pls 87-99 in Seitz, A. (ed.). The Macrolepidoptera of the World: A Systematic Description of the Hitherto Known Macrolepidoptera. Stuttgart: Alfred Kernen Vol. 9 1197 pp.
 Fruhstorfer, H., 1912. The Indo-Australian Rhopalocera. [Nymphalidae]. 453-536, 545-560 pls 115, 119, 123-138 in Seitz, A. (ed.). The Macrolepidoptera of the World: A Systematic Description of the Hitherto Known Macrolepidoptera. Stuttgart: Alfred Kernen Vol. 9 1197 pp.
 Fruhstorfer H., 1910 The Indo-Australian Rhopalocera. [Pieridae] in Seitz, A. (ed.). The Macrolepidoptera of the World: A Systematic Description of the Hitherto Known Macrolepidoptera. Stuttgart: Alfred Kernen Vol. 9 1197 pp.
 Fruhstorfer H., 1915-1924 The Indo-Australian Rhopalocera [Lycaenidae (pars)] in Seitz, A. (ed.). The Macrolepidoptera of the World: A Systematic Description of the Hitherto Known Macrolepidoptera. Stuttgart: Alfred Kernen Vol. 9 1197 pp.
 Hanafusa, H. 1994 Ten new butterflies from Indonesia and Laos (Lepidoptera: Papilionidae, Satyridae, Nymphalidae). Futao 16: 16-20
 Jordan, K., 1908-1909 The Indo-Australian Rhopalocera [Papilionidae] in Seitz, A. (ed.). The Macrolepidoptera of the World: A Systematic Description of the Hitherto Known Macrolepidoptera. Stuttgart: Alfred Kernen Vol. 9 1197 pp.
 Kimura, Y., T.Aoki, S.Yamaguchi, Y.Uémura, & T.Saito., 2011 The Butterflies of Thailand. Based on Yunosuke KIMURA Collection vol.1. Hesperiidae, Papilionidae, Pieridae.Mokuyosha. (220pp)
 Hanafusa, H., 1987: New Subspecies of Charaxes, Polyura and Moduza from South East Asia.Iwase 4:14-37, 4 pls.
 George Frederick Leycester Marshall and Lionel de Nicéville The Butterflies of India, Burmah and Ceylon. a Descriptive Handbook of All the Known Species of Rhopalocerous Lepidoptera Inhabiting That Region, With Notices of Allied Species Occurring in the Neighbouring Countries Along the Border; With Numerous Illustrations. Calcutta:Central Press Co., ld., 1882-90. online
 Murayama, S. and Kimura, Y., 1990: Some new butterflies from Thailand. Nature and Insects 25(2):19-24, figs.1-23.
 Alexander L. Monastyrskii Butterflies of Vietnam Vol. 1 (2005) Nymphalidae: Satyrinae.  Vol. 2 (2007) Papilionidae . Vol. 3 (2011) Nymphalidae: Danainae, Amathusiinae. 2011. .[Hanoi] Dolphin Media Co., [Hanoi], Vietnam-Russia Research Tropical Centre.
 Alexander L. Monastyrskii and Alexey L Devyatkin Butterflies of Vietnam: An Illustrated Checklist 
 Motono, A & N. Negishi, 1989 Butterflies of Laos. (in Japanese) Kirihara Shoten, Tokyo. 215pp.
 Okubo, 1983 Butterflies of Tioman Island, West Malaysia, with the description of new species Tyô to Ga 33 (3,4): 168-184
 Seitz, A., 1924-1927 The Indo-Australian Rhopalocera [Lycaenidae (pars)] in Seitz, A. (ed.). The Macrolepidoptera of the World: A Systematic Description of the Hitherto Known Macrolepidoptera. Stuttgart: Alfred Kernen Vol. 9 1197 pp.
 Talbot, G. (1939) The Fauna of British India, Including Ceylon and Burma Papilionidae, Pieridae xxix + 600 p - 184 figs - 1 folding map - 3 col. pl. Butterflies. Vol. 1 online
 Talbot, G. (1947) The Fauna of British India, Including Ceylon and Burma Danaidae, Satyridae, Amathusiidae and Acraeidae. xv + 506 p - 104 figs - 2 col. pl. Butterflies. Vol. 2 online
 Woodfield, E. & R. Murton, 2006 Butterfly Field Guide Southwest Cambodia. Frontier-Cambodia.
 Papers published in "Butterflies (Teinopalpus)" Journal of The Butterfly Society of Japan List
 Key papers listed by author at Wikispecies are by: Edward John Godfrey, Yunosuke Kimura, Henry Maurice Pendlebury, Alexander Steven Corbet, Osamu Yata, Takashi Shirôzu, John Nevill Eliot, Amnuay Pinratan, Yunosuke Kimura, Kotaro Saito, Yasuo Seki, papers by Japanese authors in Yadoriga (Entomological Society of Japan) online and open access)

Insects of Laos
Laos
Laos